National Highway 83 (NH 83) is a primary national highway in India. NH-83 runs in an east-west direction, entirely within the state of Tamil Nadu in India. 4-laning of Pollachi to Dindigul stretch was approved in 2018.

The stretch between Thanjavur, Thiruvarur and Nagapattinam is being upgraded into Two lane with paved shoulders.

Route 

NH83 connects Coimbatore, Pollachi, Udumalpet , Palani, Oddanchatram, Dindigul, Tiruchirappalli, Thanjavur, Needamangalam, Thiruvarur and Nagapattinam in the state of Tamil Nadu.

Junctions  

  Terminal near Coimbatore.
  near Dindigul
  near Dindigul
  near Dindigul
  near Tiruchirappalli
  near Tiruchirappalli
  near Thanjavur
  Terminal near Kolebira.

See also 
 List of National Highways in India
 List of National Highways in India by state

References

External links 

 NH 83 on OpenStreetMap

National highways in India
National Highways in Tamil Nadu